The London Borough of Islington is a London borough which forms part of Inner London. Islington has an estimated population of 215,667. It was formed in 1965 under the London Government Act 1963, which simultaneously abolished the metropolitan boroughs of Islington and Finsbury.

The new entity remains the second smallest borough in London and the third-smallest district in England. The borough contains two Westminster parliamentary constituencies; Islington North, represented by former Labour Party leader Jeremy Corbyn, and Islington South & Finsbury represented by Labour MP Emily Thornberry. The local authority is Islington Council. The borough is home to football club Arsenal, one of the premier league clubs in England and its home Emirates Stadium.

Etymology
Islington was originally named by the Saxons Giseldone (1005), then Gislandune (1062). The name means 'Gīsla's hill' from the Old English personal name Gīsla and dun 'hill', 'down'. The name then later mutated to Isledon, which remained in use well into the 17th century when the modern form arose. In medieval times, Islington was just one of many small manors in the area, along with Bernersbury, Neweton Berewe or Hey-bury, and Canonesbury (Barnsbury, Highbury and Canonbury – names first recorded in the 13th and 14th centuries). "Islington" came to be applied as the name for the parish covering these villages and was the name chosen for the Metropolitan Borough of Islington on its formation in 1899. On the merger with Finsbury to form the modern borough, this name came to be applied to the whole borough.

Geography
The southern part of the borough, south of the A501 Pentonville Road and City Road, forms part of the central London congestion charging zone and the Ultra Low Emission Zone.  A significant part of the southern section of the borough borders the City of London, with the area to the west bordering the London Borough of Camden. The central London area includes Farringdon and Old Street stations both in Zone 1.

Districts

The borough includes the areas:
 Angel
 Archway
 Barnsbury
 Canonbury
 Clerkenwell
 Farringdon
 Finsbury
 Finsbury Park (split between three boroughs. Other boroughs are London Borough of Haringey and London Borough of Hackney).
 Highbury
 Highgate
 Holloway
 Islington
 Kings Cross
 Lower Holloway
 Mildmay
 Nag's Head
 Newington Green
 Old Street
 Pentonville
 St Luke's
 Tufnell Park
 Upper Holloway

Wards

 Barnsbury
 Bunhill
 Caledonian
 Canonbury
 Clerkenwell
 Finsbury Park
 Highbury East
 Highbury West
 Hillrise
 Holloway
 Junction (part of Archway and Upper Holloway)
 Mildmay
 Saint George's
 Saint Mary's (covering most of Upper Street)
 Saint Peter's
 Tollington

Governance

Islington Council is the borough's local authority. It is a London borough council, one of thirty-two principal subdivisions of the administrative area of Greater London. The council was created by the London Government Act 1963 and replaced two local authorities: Finsbury Metropolitan Borough Council and Islington Metropolitan Borough Council. The former  Islington Metropolitan Town Hall, at the intersection of Upper Street and Richmond Grove, serves as the present Borough's council building.

Islington is divided into 17 wards, each electing three councillors. Following the May 2022 election, Islington Council comprises 48 Labour Party councillors and 3 Green Party councillors. Of these 51 councillors, the Leader of the council is Councillor Kaya Comer-Schwartz and Councillor Caroline Russell is the leader of the Green opposition group.

Islington is represented by two parliamentary constituencies. Islington North is represented by Jeremy Corbyn of the Labour Party, the Leader of the Opposition between 2015 and 2020. Islington South and Finsbury is represented by Emily Thornberry, former Shadow First Secretary of State and Shadow Secretary of State for Foreign and Commonwealth Affairs and current Shadow Secretary of State for International Trade of the Labour Party.

Islington forms part of the North East constituency for the London Assembly, represented by Jennette Arnold, also of the Labour Party.

Economy
In the Victorian Age, some parts of Islington such as Clerkenwell were known for their poverty, which George Gissing describes in his naturalist novel, The Nether World (1889).
 

Inmarsat has its head office in the borough.

Major public and private bodies

Prisons
There is one prison in Islington, a men's prison, HM Prison Pentonville. Until it closed in 2016 there was also a women's prison HM Prison Holloway, which in the early 20th century was used to hold many suffragettes.

Transport
The Borough boasts a large transport network for rail, bus, cycles and road users.

London Underground
There are ten London Underground stations in the borough across London fare zones 1, 2 and 3. These stations are principally served by the Northern, Piccadilly and Victoria lines, although the Circle, Hammersmith & City and Metropolitan lines also pass through the Borough:
 Angel  
 Archway 
 Arsenal 
 Caledonian Road 
 Farringdon     
 Finsbury Park   
 Highbury & Islington   
 Holloway Road 
 Old Street  
 Tufnell Park 

The Piccadilly line carries passengers to key London destinations, including the West End and Heathrow Airport. The Northern and Victoria lines also link the Borough to the West End, whilst the Northern line (Bank Branch) also passes through the City of London.

Just beyond the Borough's borders are King's Cross St Pancras (in the London Borough of Camden) and Moorgate (in the city).

London Overground
There are also several London Overground stations in the borough, all but one of which are in London fare zone 2:
 Caledonian Road & Barnsbury 
 Canonbury 
 Crouch Hill 
 Highbury & Islington    
 Upper Holloway

National Rail
There are several other National Rail stations in Islington, which offer direct services to destinations across London, East Anglia and South East England:
 Drayton Park 
 Essex Road 
 Farringdon     
 Finsbury Park   
 Highbury & Islington   
 Old Street  

Farringdon and Finsbury Park are served by Thameslink services, with some trains travelling direct to Gatwick Airport, as well as destinations including Cambridge, Peterborough, Brighton and Sevenoaks. Other stations, including Finsbury Park, are served by Great Northern trains which normally operate between Moorgate and Welwyn Garden City. The Elizabeth line calls at Farringdon.

Moorgate lies just to the south of the Borough, in the City of London, whilst King's Cross lies to the Borough's immediate west, with destinations including Sheffield, Leeds, Newcastle, Edinburgh and Inverness.

Travel to work
In March 2011, the main forms of transport that residents used to travel to work were: underground, metro, light rail, tram, 19.4% of all residents aged 16–74; bus, minibus or coach, 10.3%; on foot, 10.3%; bicycle, 6.2%; driving a car or van, 6.0%; train, 3.7%; work mainly at or from home, 3.6%.

Attractions and institutions

 Almeida Theatre
 Angel Central shopping centre (formerly the Islington N1 Centre), containing:
 O2 Academy Islington
 Vue cinema
 Artillery Ground
 Pleasance Islington theatre
 Courtyard Theatre
 Emirates Stadium (and the former Arsenal Stadium at Highbury)
 The Estorick Collection of Modern Italian Art in Canonbury Square
 Freightliners City Farm
 Hen and Chickens Theatre
 Islington Arts Factory, in Parkhurst Road
 Islington Local History Centre, located at Finsbury Library
 Islington Museum, located at Finsbury Library
 John Salt, cocktail bar on Upper Street
 The King's Head Theatre
 Little Angel Theatre a puppet theatre and producer of the Suspense Puppetry Festival of London
 London Canal Museum, located in New Wharf Road, King's Cross
 London Charterhouse
 London Screen Academy, on Highbury Grove - specialist film/TV sixth form academy
 Odeon Cinema, located on Holloway Road
 Peter Benenson House, headquarters of Amnesty International
 Sadler's Wells Theatre
 St John's Gate, Clerkenwell (Islington's badge for London2012)
 The Screen On The Green, a single screen cinema on Upper Street
 Union Chapel
 Wesley's Chapel

Demographics

In 1801, the civil parishes that form the modern borough had a total population of 65,721. This rose steadily throughout the 19th century, as the district became built up; exceeding 200,000 in the middle of the century. When the railways arrived the rate of population growth increased—reaching nearly 400,000 by the turn of the century; with the Metropolitan Borough of Finsbury particularly suffering deprivation, poverty and severe overcrowding. The increase in population peaked before World War I, falling slowly in the aftermath until World War II began an exodus from London towards the new towns under the Abercrombie Plan for London (1944). The decline in population reversed in the 1980s, but it remains below its 1951 level.

According to the 2001 census Islington had a population of 175,797. It was 75% White, including 5% White Irish, 6% Black African, 5% Black Caribbean and 2% Bangladeshi. Thirty-two per cent of the borough's residents were owner–occupiers.

According to the 2011 census, Islington has the highest population density of local authorities in England and Wales—13,875 people per square kilometre.

Islington has the second highest proportion of Irish people in the country, behind London Borough of Brent.

A 2017 study by Trust for London and the New Policy Institute found that a third of Islington residents live in poverty. This is above the London average of 27%. It also found that just 14% of local employees are in jobs which pay below the London Living Wage - which is the 4th lowest figure of any London borough.

39% of the borough are Christian, 12.8% Muslim, 1.7% are Jewish and 42.7% have no religion. Christians and Muslims live throughout the borough, while the Jewish population is highest in the north of the borough in the Hillrise and Junction wards (bordering Highgate and Crouch End).

Ethnicity

The following table shows the ethnic group of respondents in the 2001, 2011 and 2021 census in Islington.

Religion

The following shows the religious identity of residents residing in Islington according to the 2001, 2011 and the 2021 censuses.

Education

Universities
The London Borough of Islington is home to two higher education institutions:
 City, University of London at Northampton Square, formerly The City University, founded in 1894 as the Northampton Institute; and
 London Metropolitan University, North Campus on the Holloway Road, formed from the merger of the University of North London and London Guildhall University in 2002. The University of North London was founded on this site in 1896 as the Northern Polytechnic Institute.

Moorfields Eye Hospital is a major centre for postgraduate training of ophthalmologists, orthoptists, optometrists, and nurses.

Further Education
The borough also currently contains three colleges of further education:
London Screen Academy; (a sixth form academy set up by Working Title Films to train young people in behind the camera skills).
City and Islington College; and
 Westminster Kingsway College (while major improvement works are carried out at King's Cross).

There are two performing arts colleges. The Urdang Academy and the Musical Theatre Academy are both based in Islington.

Schools

The borough currently maintains 47 primary schools, 10 secondary schools, three special schools and five Pupil Referral Units. In 2000, Cambridge Education Associates, a private firm, took over the management of the Islington's state schools from the local education authority.

Media
The Islington Gazette is a local newspaper.

Freedom of the Borough
The following people and military units have received the Freedom of the Borough of Islington.

Individuals
 Arsène Wenger : 2004.

Military Units
  The Honourable Artillery Company: October 2009
 The Islington Veterans' Association: March 2015.
 The Islington and Holloway Fire Stations of the London Fire Brigade: March 2018.

See also

 List of people from the London Borough of Islington
London Screen Academy
 Arsenal F.C.
 Emirates Stadium
 Finsbury Town Hall

References

External links

 Islington Council

 
Islington
1965 establishments in England